The N'Swakamok Native Friendship Centre is a Native Friendship Centre assisting Aboriginal people migrating to or already living in Greater Sudbury, Ontario. "N'Swakamok" translates to 'where the three roads meet' in Ojibway. The Friendship Centre has developed and implemented programs and activities that serve the social, cultural, and recreational needs of the urban Native community in Sudbury.

History
The Friendship Centre was first established in 1967, through the efforts of the Nickel Belt Indian Club. The directors and some of the members were actively involved in doing work such as court-work and referral work for the Aboriginal community of Sudbury. In 1972, the Friendship Center was officially incorporated under the name of the Indian Eskimo Friendship Centre. The steering committee, which consisted of 11 people, then hired four people; a Director, Secretary, Program Director, and a trainee to work with a local court-worker. The original location of the Friendship Centre was on Ignatius Street, and was then relocated to Douglas Street, which provided more office space. The third move took the center to Larch Street. The N'Swakamok Native Friendship Centre is now located at 110 Elm Street, in Downtown Sudbury. Over the past 10 years, the Friendship Centre has developed and implemented a philosophy of community development as a part of program delivery. The Land Base Committee of the Friendship Centre began fundraising and planning in 1983. By 1986, the Committee purchased  of land on the outskirts of Sudbury, which helped to provide both cultural growth and awareness.

Aims and objectives 
To provide a medium for the meeting of Native and non-Native people and the development of mutual understanding through common activities.
To stimulate and assist Native self-expression and the development of Native leadership by providing assistance in the implementation of programmes and services which provide opportunities for Native people to improve their social and economic status.
To assist and encourage the study of Native needs and the planning of services with Native people in both public and private agencies.

The Friendship Centre is governed by a Board of Directors, who are elected at annual meetings of public attendance. Membership fees are $1.00 for students, $2.00 for adults, and $3.00 for families. The Friendship Centre also works cooperatively with both public and private agencies of drug and alcohol abuse and legal and social services. It is able to develop its programs in a way that reflects its community and their communication practices and styles. The N'Swakamok Native Friendship Centre has grown in knowledge, skills, communication, space and staff. Presently it houses 14 different supportive programs, hosts many activities and provides employment for 28 staff. Programs offered by the Friendship Centre include an Aboriginal Courtwork Program, a Literacy Program, an Employment Program, an Aboriginal Family Support Program, and a Community Support Program.

External links

Organizations based in Greater Sudbury
First Nations organizations in Ontario